The long-tailed porcupine (Trichys fasciculata) is a species of rodent in the family Hystricidae. It is monotypic within the genus Trichys, and is found in Brunei, Indonesia, and Malaysia.

Physical appearance 
Long-tailed porcupines’ appearances are somewhat rat-like. Their weight is usually around 1.7-2.3 kg but can be as small as 1.5 kg and their length can be between 27.9-48 cm excluding their tail which is usually up to 24 cm. To save themselves from predators including larger mammals, snakes and birds, their tails can be lost when grabbed but will not be regenerated. Long-tailed porcupine's broad paws allow them to be good climbers, hence they are able to climb trees and shrubs to search for food. Their front legs consist of four toes while the back legs consist of five toes.

Long-tailed porcupines are commonly black or brown in colour while their underbody is usually white. The short dark brown flattened spines with white base cover their entire body with bristles-like hair in between, except their head and underbody, which are covered entirely with hair. Their spines are shorter than 5 cm, making them the shortest in the Hystricidae family. Long-tailed porcupines' tails are brown in colour and are mostly covered with scales. The tips of the tail, their rear and the hindquarters are covered in brush-like hollow quills which do not produce sound when shaken, unlike other porcupine species.

Diet 
Long-tailed porcupines are primarily herbivores (folivore i.e. diet consist mainly consist of plant material including foliage and lignivore i.e. diet mainly consist of wood), with the main diets being leaves, wood, roots, bark and cambium layer of trees, fruits, seeds and bamboo shoots. They also occasionally consume invertebrate insects and terrestrial non-insect arthropods. Long-tailed porcupine helps in seed dispersal as they are food hoarders who collect fruits and seeds. Additionally, they feed on the cambium layer, causing the death of the trees which contributes both negatively and positively, positive being that the dead trees create habitats for some bird species. To humans, they also destroy crops for example pineapple and therefore, is sometimes considered a nuisance.

References 

Mammals described in 1801
Hystricidae
Mammals of Borneo
Mammals of Brunei
Rodents of Indonesia
Rodents of Malaysia
Taxonomy articles created by Polbot